The Serbian National Badminton Championships is a tournament organized to crown the best badminton players in Serbia. They are held since 2007.

Past winners

External links
 Badminton Association of Serbia - National Championship History

National badminton championships
Sports competitions in Serbia
Badminton in Serbia